The term National Salvation Front has been used by political parties in several countries:
National Salvation Front (Benin)
National Salvation Front (Cambodia)
National Salvation Front (Egypt)
National Salvation Front (Romania)
National Salvation Front (Russia)
National Salvation Front (Tunisia)
National Front for Salvation (Tunisia)
National Salvation Front (Sri Lanka)
National Front for the Salvation of Libya
National Salvation Front (South Sudan)
National Salvation Front in Syria

See also
National Salvation Army (disambiguation)
National Salvation Movement (Colombia)
National Salvation Government (Libya)
National Salvation Junta (Portugal)
National Salvation Committee (Ukraine)
National Salvation Party (Turkey)